The 2019 Corrigan Oil 200 is a NASCAR Gander Outdoors Truck Series race held on August 10, 2019, at Michigan International Speedway in Brooklyn, Michigan. Contested over 105 laps due to an overtime finish on the  D-shaped oval, it was the 16th race of the 2019 NASCAR Gander Outdoors Truck Series season, and the final race of the regular season before the playoffs.

Background

Track

The track is used primarily for NASCAR events. It is sometimes known as a "sister track" to Texas World Speedway, and was used as the basis of Auto Club Speedway. The track is owned by International Speedway Corporation (ISC). Michigan International Speedway is recognized as one of motorsports' premier facilities because of its wide racing surface and high banking (by open-wheel standards; the 18-degree banking is modest by stock car standards).

Entry list

Practice

First practice

Final practice

Qualifying

Qualifying results

Race

Summary
Ross Chastain started on pole and led all 20 laps of Stage 1. His day ended early after contact between Johnny Sauter and Codie Rohrbaugh on pit road severely damaged Chastain's truck as it sent Rohrbaugh's truck into Chastain going onto pit road.

Ben Rhodes assumed the race lead and held it until Christian Eckes spun and brought out the first caution on lap 33. Rhodes and many of the leaders pitted for tires and fuel, but Brett Moffitt stayed out, beating Austin Hill during the final laps of Stage 2.

When the final stage began, Sheldon Creed and Rhodes (who were both playoff contenders) battled fiercely, exchanging the lead multiple times until Cory Roper slammed the wall on lap 57 and brought out the yellow. Moffitt stayed out again and assumed the race lead on the restart, but was passed by Todd Gilliland later on that lap.

The caution was brought out again on lap 66 when Rohrbaugh spun, prompting Moffitt to pit while Gilliland stayed out. Gilliland and Rhodes battled for the race lead from the lap 70 restart up until lap 76, when they made contact while blocking each other. This caused Gilliland to drop from the lead to sixth, while Rhodes was forced to pit after cutting a tire. Hill inherited the lead afterwards, battling with Tyler Ankrum through two cautions for Eckes spinning twice on lap 86 and lap 93.

On lap 97, Ankrum took the lead on the restart but spun his tires while Matt Crafton was pushing him, sending his truck spinning into oncoming traffic on the frontstretch, destroying the three DGR-Crosley cars while also taking Gilliland out of playoff contention. 

Afterwards, Hill held off a charging Creed to win the final race of the 2019 regular season. Grant Enfinger captured the regular season championship by the end of Stage 1, securing 15 playoff points. Due to Hill's win, Crafton took the final playoff spot on points over Rhodes, Creed, Tyler Dippel, and Harrison Burton.

Stage Results

Stage One
Laps: 20

Stage Two
Laps: 20

Final Stage Results

Stage Three
Laps: 65

. – Driver made the playoffs cut.

References

2019 in sports in Michigan
Corrigan Oil 200
NASCAR races at Michigan International Speedway